Kalpika Ganesh is an Indian actress who appears in Telugu films. She made her film debut with the film Prayanam in 2009.

Early life 
Kalpika Ganesh was born in Hyderabad, India to a Iyengar family. She has completed BA from Vivekananda College, Secunderabad.

Career 
Kalpika Ganesh started her career in modeling and later in 2009, she made her film debut from the film Prayanam, directed by Chandra Sekhar Yeleti. Later she acted in other movies and web series. She has also appeared in film like Sarocharu, Seethamma Vakitlo Sirimalle Chettu, Sita on the Road Apart from films she also appeared in web series like Loser and Ekkadiki Ee Parugu.

Filmography 
 All films are in Telugu films unless otherwise mentioned

Television

References

External links 

 
Living people
Actresses in Telugu cinema
1991 births
21st-century Indian actresses
Actresses from Hyderabad, India
Telugu actresses
Indian film actresses